Gelechia caudatae is a moth of the family Gelechiidae. It is found in North America, where it has been recorded from Washington.

The larvae feed on Salix caudata.

References

Moths described in 1934
Gelechia